Pirates vs. Ninjas Dodgeball is a fantasy dodgeball video game developed by American studio Blazing Lizard and published by Gamecock for Xbox Live Arcade and SouthPeak Games for the Wii. The game was released on September 3, 2008 for Xbox Live Arcade, while the Wii version was released in 2009. Both were porly received by critics. The Xbox 360 verion has an aggregated Metacritic review score of 44/100 and the lowest review is 16/100.

The game is inspired by the popular Internet meme Pirates versus Ninjas. It is played between various oddball groups, including the eponymous Pirate and Ninja teams, as well as other teams like the zombies and robots. Players on each team behave stereotypically, e.g., zombies are slow and defensive.

Gameplay

Players have a limited reserve of energy to use when playing, and all activity drains energy, including running and throwing. Each group has a unique set of powers, such as cloaking, which drains energy even faster. Players can regain energy by various actions, such as successfully catching a thrown ball.

The ball can be thrown in several ways. Throwing the ball while running causes the ball to move in the direction faced. Throwing the ball while standing still allows a 360 degree aim, with better tracking. Throwing the ball while jumping increases the force at which the ball hits.

Reception

The game received "generally unfavorable reviews" on both platforms according to the review aggregation website Metacritic. Official Xbox Magazine gave the Xbox 360 version a score of six out of ten, over five months before the game was released.

See also
Double D Dodgeball
Super Dodge Ball

References

External links
 

2008 video games
Dodgeball video games
Ninja parody
Video games about ninja
SouthPeak Games
Video games about pirates
Video games developed in the United States
Wii games
Xbox 360 Live Arcade games
Multiplayer and single-player video games